The 1877 South Australian Football Association season was the inaugural season of the top-level league of Australian rules football in South Australia. The clubs participating were South Adelaide, Victorian, Adelaide, Port Adelaide, Woodville, South Park,  and Bankers.

South Adelaide and Victorian would share the premiership honours, while the Bankers Football Club, who finished last without a win, folded at the end of the season.

South Australian Football Association 
The newly formed South Australian Football Association decided that the playing fields for the season must be between 180 and 200 yards (165-183m) long and 120-150 yards (110-137m) wide, with pushing from behind being prohibited. For clubs to gain membership of the association, they would need to pay two guineas for the year.

Premiership Season

Round 1

Round 2

Round 3

Round 4

Round 5

Round 6

Round 7

Round 8

Round 9

Round 10

Round 11

Round 12

Round 13

Round 14

Round 15

Round 16

Round 17

Round 18

Round 19

Summary of other matches 
Adelaide, 4 goals, beat Kapunda, 2.  
Woodville, 1 goal, beat Gawler, 0.  
Adelaide, 1 goal, tied Gawler, 1.  
Adelaide, 3 goals, beat Kapunda, 2.  
Melbourne, 1 goal, beat Victorian, 0.  
Melbourne, 5 goals, beat Combined Team, 0.  
South Australians, 3 goals, beat Victorians, 1.  
St. Kilda, 5 goals, beat Adelaide, 2.  
St. Kilda. 7 goals, beat South Australians, 2.

Ladder 
Further, while Adelaide finished with one more win than the other two clubs, they played 17 games to 13 and 14 respectively.

It was declared  and  would be deemed joint Champion Club (premiers).

Note: Woodville were ranked above South Park on head-to-head record (2-1).

Membership

See also

References

External links 

SAFA season
South Australian National Football League